Eupithecia anamnesa is a moth in the  family Geometridae.

References

Moths described in 1994
anamnesa